Parapolyacanthia trifolium is a species of beetle in the family Cerambycidae. It was described by Fauvel in 1906, originally under the genus Polyacanthia.

References

Acanthoderini
Beetles described in 1906